The 2012–13 season was Juventus Football Club's 115th in existence and sixth consecutive season in the top flight of Italian football. The club won their second Serie A title in a row.

The season was the first since 1992–93 without former Captain and legend Alessandro del Piero, who joined Sydney FC.

2011–12 Italian football scandal
The events were overshadowed by the recent Calcioscommesse scandals. First team manager Antonio Conte, his assistant Angelo Alessio, technical director Christian Stellini and players Leonardo Bonucci and Simone Pepe were among the accused. Stellini, Bonucci and Pepe were later acquitted, but Stellini resigned from his position in August 2012. Club president Andrea Agnelli released a statement stating his support for the staff and players. Conte and his assistant Angelo Alessio were handed ten-month and eight-month touchline bans respectively by the FIGC disciplinary committee and public prosecution office. Agnelli publicly announced the club's intention to appeal the charges. Team coach Massimo Carrera was appointed caretaker manager for the duration of Conte's ban. Conte returned to his position in December 2012 for the match against Palermo. Conte and Alessio were at Siena at the time the scandal took place, so Juventus itself was not penalized for any wrongdoing. No one involved with Juventus at the time was implicated in the scandal.

Players

Squad information
Players and squad numbers last updated on 31 January 2013.
Note: Flags indicate national team as has been defined under FIFA eligibility rules. Players may hold more than one non-FIFA nationality.

Transfers

In

|}

Total spending:  €54.45 million

Out

|}

Total revenue:  €20.55 million

Net Expenditure:  €33.9 million

Reserve squad

On loan

Loan deals expire 30 June 2013

Co-ownership

Co-ownership deals expire 21 June 2013

Primavera

Non-playing staff

Source: Juventus.com (archive link)

Pre-season and friendlies

Competitions

Supercoppa Italiana

Serie A

The fixtures for the 2012–13 Serie A were announced on 26 July 2012. The season starts on Saturday 25 August 2012 with Juventus taking on Parma at the Juventus Stadium, and ends Sunday 19 May 2013 with a match away against Sampdoria.

League table

Results summary

Results by round

Matches

Coppa Italia

Juventus started the Coppa Italia directly in the round of 16, as one of the eight best seeded teams.

UEFA Champions League

Group stage

Notes
Note 1: FC Nordsjælland played their home matches at Parken Stadium, Copenhagen instead of their own Farum Park.

Knockout phase

Round of 16

Quarter-finals

Statistics

Appearances and goals

|-
! colspan=14 style="background:#DCDCDC; text-align:center"| Goalkeepers

|-
! colspan=14 style="background:#DCDCDC; text-align:center"| Defenders

|-
! colspan=14 style="background:#DCDCDC; text-align:center"| Midfielders

|-
! colspan=14 style="background:#DCDCDC; text-align:center"| Forwards

|-
! colspan=14 style="background:#DCDCDC; text-align:center"| Players transferred out during the season

Goalscorers

Last updated: 19 May 2013

Disciplinary record

References

Juventus F.C. seasons
Juventus
Juventus
Italian football championship-winning seasons